Sipalinus gigas is a species of beetles belonging to the family Curculionidae.

Description
The surface is covered with brownish crusty coating. Beak is moderately arcuate and punctured. Pronotum is longer than wide. Elytra shows dark brown stripes with whitish areas bearing tubercles. These beetles are usually found under bark of dying or felled trees and the larvae live in dead or decaying trees.

Subspecies
The species can be divided into the following two subspecies:

Sipalinus gigas gigas (Fabricius, 1775)
Sipalinus gigas granulatus (Fabricius, 1801)

Distribution
This species can be found in Korea, China, Japan, Himalayas, India and islands of Australasia, from Philippines to New Guinea, Solomon islands and eastern Australia.

References 

  Biolib
 Vaurie, Patricia Weevils of the tribe Sipalini (Coleoptera, Curculionidae, Rhynchophorinae). Part 3, The genus Sipalinus. American Museum novitates; no. 2463
 NAKAMURA Katsunori, XINRU LANG Development and survivorship of the japanese giant weevil, Sipalinus gigas (Fabricius) (Coleoptera: Rhynchophoridae), in cut pine bolts

External links 
 Sipalinus gigas on Animal Pictures Archive

Dryophthorinae
Beetles of Oceania
Beetles described in 1775
Taxa named by Johan Christian Fabricius